Peter Sharis (born January 8, 1969) is an American former rower. He competed in the men's coxless pair event at the 1992 Summer Olympics. He graduated from Harvard University and Vanderbilt University.

References

External links
 

1969 births
Living people
American male rowers
Olympic rowers of the United States
Rowers at the 1992 Summer Olympics
Sportspeople from Salem, Massachusetts
Harvard Crimson rowers
Vanderbilt University alumni